The 2012 World Women's U18  Championship Division 1 tournament was played in Tromsø, Norway, from 29 December 2011 to 4 January 2012. The qualification tournament was played in Asiago, Italy, from 29 November to 4 December 2011. Featuring the "biggest success in Hungarian women's hockey" the young Magyars won all ten of their games and get the opportunity to compete with the elite hockey nations in 2013. Remarkably, at least fifteen of their twenty players remain eligible for the U18 tournament next year.

Qualification tournament

Final standings

Final tournament

Final standings

Results
All times are local (CET – UTC+01).

Scoring leaders
List shows the top skaters sorted by points, then goals. If the list exceeds 10 skaters because of a tie in points, all of the tied skaters are shown.
GP = Games played; G = Goals; A = Assists; Pts = Points; +/− = Plus/minus; PIM = Penalties in minutes; POS = Position

Leading goaltenders
Only the goaltenders, based on save percentage, who have played 40% of their team's minutes are included in this list.
TOI = Time On Ice (minutes:seconds); GA = Goals against; GAA = Goals against average; Sv% = Save percentage; SO = Shutouts

References

External links 
 IIHF.com

2012
World
World
2012